Dragoș Petru Iancu (born 29 September 2002) is a Romanian professional footballer who plays as a midfielder for FC Hermannstadt.

References

External links
 
 

2000 births
Living people
People from Huedin
Romanian footballers
Romania youth international footballers
Association football forwards
Liga I players
CS Gaz Metan Mediaș players
FC Hermannstadt players